The Andhra Pradesh Congress Committee (APCC) is the state unit of Indian National Congress for the state of Andhra Pradesh, India. The APCC has its headquarters at Andhra Ratna Bhawan, Vijayawada, Andhra Pradesh. The APCC is responsible for Congress party units of all the 13 districts in Andhra Pradesh.

Office Bearers

List of PCC Presidents

List of AICC Presidents from Andhra Pradesh

Andhra Pradesh Assembly Election History
Total number of seats in the Andhra Pradesh Assembly was 294 . After state division in 2014  total seats come down to 175.

• In 1957, elections were conducted in the newly added region of Telangana alone which includes 105 seats and then in 1962 elections were held for the state as a whole in all 300 seats.

• In 1978 Indira Gandhi led INC (I) won 175 seats while INC(O) won 30 seats with 17.01%.

Lok Sabha Election History
Total number of Lok Sabha seats in Andhra Pradesh is 42 and after division seats come down to 25 out of which Congress has none. Although the state has been one of its bastions for a long time, Congress has swiftly performed a political suicide by trampling upon the 'balance' during bifurcation of Telangana and Andhra Pradesh. Today, Congress is more of a namesake party failing to win even a single State assembly seat or Lok Sabha seat. Most of its prior leaders left the party leaving it with a couple of loyal remnants who have since faced bitter defeats. With a present vote share of 2.56% and almost no real hope of increasing it despite strong incumbency, Congress is not expected to do any better in the near future.

References

External links

Indian National Congress by state or union territory
Political parties in Andhra Pradesh